The law of Mexico is based upon the Constitution of Mexico and follows the civil law tradition.

Sources
The hierarchy of sources of law can be viewed as the Constitution, legislation, regulations, and then custom. Alternatively, the hierarchy can be viewed as the Constitution, treaties, statutes, codes, doctrine, custom, and then general principles of law.

Federal Constitution
The Constitution of Mexico is the fundamental law.

Legislation
The Mexican Congress creates legislation in the form of regulatory laws that implement the Constitution, organic acts that implement the organization, powers, and functions of governmental agencies, and ordinary laws. They are published in the Official Journal of the Federation (DOF).

Regulations
The President of Mexico creates regulations for the purpose of interpreting, clarifying, expanding or supplementing the language of legislative enactments. They are published in the Official Journal of the Federation (DOF).

Case law
The decisions of the Supreme Court are binding on lower courts as  only upon five consecutive and uninterrupted decisions approved by at least eight justices when in plenary sessions or by at least four justices when in chambers. The decisions of the Collegiate Circuit Courts are  provided they are based upon five consecutive and uninterrupted decisions approved by unanimity of votes of the magistrates who compose each collegiate court.

Such decisions are published in the Federal Judicial Weekly through its gazette.

In some jurisdictions, there may also exist executive administrative courts, which are not bound by these .

Doctrine

The civil law tradition was developed by, and as such the "authorities" were and continue to be, legal scholars and not judges and lawyers as in the common law tradition. The legal treatises produced by these scholars are called doctrine, and are used much in the same way case law is used in the common law tradition. However, these scholarly contributions do not carry the force of law and are not legally binding.

Custom
Mexican law recognizes custom, the rules, principles, and norms formed through a gradual but uniform passage of time, but only when this recognition is based upon an explicit provision of the applicable law allowing for such recognition.

General principles of law
"General principles of law", expressly cited by Article 14 of the Constitution, have not been expressly defined by legislation, but legal maxims such as equity, good faith, the right of self-defense, and  tend to be cited by legal scholars.

State constitutions and law
Each of Mexico's 31 states and Mexico City has its own constitution, known as a state or local constitution ( or ). Each state's or Mexico City's laws and regulations are published in their respective Official State Gazettes. At the state and local level, publication of complete binding court opinions (versus ) is extremely limited or simply nonexistent.

Jurisprudence
The civil law tradition (as developed by the legal scholars, i.e. doctrine) tends to treat the divisions of law in normative terms. There are two major areas of law: private law, concerning the relationships between individuals, and public law, concerning the relationships between individuals and the government. The civil code is the most important embodiment of law, based on Roman law. Other topics include those related to philosophy of law, including the major schools of thought and the major disagreements; objective law and subjective rights; substantive law and procedural law; statutory law and customary law; federal law, state law and municipal law; and national law, international law and community law.

Public law
Mexico's major codes regarding public law are the Federal Criminal Code (the criminal code) and the National Criminal Procedure Code (the code of criminal procedure). Other codes of importance include the Fiscal Code (tax law) and the Federal Labor Law (Mexican labor law).

Private law
Mexico's major codes regarding private law are the Federal Civil Code (the civil code), Federal Commercial Code (the commercial code), and the Federal Civil Procedure Code (the code of civil procedure).

See also

Topics
 Abortion in Mexico
 Capital punishment in Mexico
 Crime in Mexico
 Life imprisonment in Mexico
 Euthanasia in Mexico
 Gun politics in Mexico
 Human rights in Mexico
 Illegal immigration in Mexico
 Intellectual property law in Mexico
 Mexican labor law
 LGBT rights in Mexico
 Mexican nationality law
 Recurso de amparo

Other
 Politics of Mexico
 Law enforcement in Mexico

References

External links

Sources
 , containing all laws, treaties, regulations, decrees, and notices of federal, state, municipal, and borough governments,  from the Secretariat of the Interior 
 Federal laws in force from the Chamber of Deputies 
 Federal regulations in force from the Chamber of Deputies 
 Federal regulatory rules from the Chamber of Deputies 
 Official Journal of the Federation from the Secretariat of the Interior 
 Federal Judicial Weekly from the Supreme Court 
 State law web links from the Chamber of Deputies